Bai Renfu (c. 1226−1306), also known as Bai Pu, was a renowned Chinese playwright of the Yuan dynasty.

He wrote 16 plays, three of which are extant:
 Over the Wall (裴少俊牆頭馬上 Péi Shǎo Jùn Qiáng Tóu Mǎ Shàng)
 Rain on the Paulownia Tree (唐明皇秋夜梧桐雨 Táng Míng Huáng Qiū Yè Wú Tóng Yǔ) about  Emperor Xuanzong and Lady Yang Guifei:
 Romance of the East Wall (董秀英花月東牆記 Dǒng Xiù Yīng Huā Yuè Dōng Qiáng Jì)

Biography
A scion of an important Jin dynasty family, Bai Renfu's grandfather held a post at the powerful Bureau of Military Affairs, and his father was a close friend of the poet Yuan Haowen. However, the defeat of the Jin dynasty by the Mongol Empire resulted in a major upheaval in social relationships. Nevertheless, Bo Renfu achieved honorary rank and an official position in the Yuan dynasty as Minister of Protocol.

See also
Zaju

Notes

References
Crump, J. I. (1990). Chinese Theater in the Days of Kublai Khan. (Ann Arbor: Center for Chinese Studies The University of Michigan) .

1226 births
1306 deaths
Yuan dynasty poets
Yuan dynasty dramatists and playwrights
People from Xinzhou
Poets from Shanxi
13th-century Chinese poets
14th-century Chinese poets
14th-century Chinese dramatists and playwrights
13th-century Chinese dramatists and playwrights